Events happened in 1894 in Russia.

Births
 Nikita Khrushchev, Soviet statesman.

Deaths
 Alexander III, monarch (born 1845)
 Nadezhda von Meck, patron of Peter Tchaikovsky (b. 1831)

References

1894 in Russia
Years of the 19th century in the Russian Empire